The Council for Advancement and Support of Education (CASE) is a nonprofit association of educational institutions. It serves professionals in the field of educational advancement. This field encompasses alumni relations, communications, marketing and development (fundraising) for educational institutions such as universities and independent or private schools.

CASE, headquartered in Washington, D.C., in the United States, was founded in 1974 as the result of a merger between the American Alumni Council and the American College Public Relations Association. It is one of the largest international associations of education institutions, serving nearly 3,400 universities, colleges, schools, and related organizations in 61 countries.

Its North American member institutions are divided into eight geographic districts that provide support to members through regional programs. To better serve its international membership, CASE opened a European office in London in 1994 and an Asia-Pacific office in Singapore in 2007.

Activities

CASE offers a variety of products and services such as conferences, webinars (the Online Speaker Series), books and training materials, and publishes CURRENTS magazine. It also maintains professional standards and a code of ethics for the profession.

CASE also engages in government relations, monitoring legislation and advocating the views and needs of its members.

Major awards and events 

CASE administers the annual U.S. Professors of the Year (with The Carnegie Foundation for the Advancement of Teaching) and the Circle of Excellence awards. It also holds the Summit for Advancement Leaders, an annual conference for senior-level advancement professionals. Each CASE District holds an annual conference.

References

Further reading
Chronicle of Higher Education, “College Fund-Raising Group to Open Shop in Asia-Pacific Region,” Money & Management, Volume 53, Issue 26, Page A27; http://chronicle.com/weekly/v53/i26/26a02702.htm, (March 2, 2007)
Chronicle of Higher Education, “Early Revelations of Great Teachers,” The Faculty, Volume 52, Issue 15, Page A11, http://chronicle.com/weekly/v52/i15/15a01102.htm, (December 2, 2005)
Chronicle of Higher Education, “Award-Winning Teaching,” The Faculty, Volume 53, Issue 15, Page A10, http://chronicle.com/weekly/v53/i15/15a01001.htm, (December 1, 2006)
Chronicle of Higher Education, “Donations Increase for 3rd Year in a Row,” Money & Management, Volume 53, Issue 26, Page A1, http://chronicle.com/weekly/v53/i26/26a00101.htm, (March 2, 2007)
Chronicle of Higher Education, “The Almighty Visit,” Chronicle Careers, Volume 52, Issue 34, Page C3, http://chronicle.com/weekly/v52/i34/34c00301.htm, (April 28, 2006)
Chronicle of Higher Education, “A Hypocritical Oath,” Chronicle Careers, Volume 51, Issue 33, Page C2, http://chronicle.com/weekly/v51/i33/33c00201.htm, (April 22, 2005)
Chronicle of Higher Education, “Meeting Offers Tips on Alumni Loyalty,” Money & Management, Volume 51, Issue 47, Page A30, http://chronicle.com/weekly/v51/i47/47a03003.htm, (July 29, 2005)
Chronicle of Higher Education, “Counting Gifts: New Rules Irk Fund Raisers,” Money & Management, Volume 51, Issue 27, Page A27, http://chronicle.com/weekly/v51/i27/27a02701.htm, (March 11, 2005)
Chronicle of Higher Education, “Fund Raisers Become Harder to Find and Tougher to Keep,” Money & Management, Volume 52, Issue 10, Page A34, http://chronicle.com/weekly/v52/i10/10a03401.htm, (October 28, 2005)
Earth Times, “Tri-C Professor Named Top Community College Educator in the U.S.” http://www.earthtimes.org/articles/show/news_press_release,23476.shtml (November 16, 2006)
Reed College News Center, “Reed College Scholar of Chinese Religions Named Professor of the Year,” http://web.reed.edu/news_center/press_releases/2006-2007/111606Prof_of_Year.html (November 16, 2006)
Rome News-Tribune, “Shorter Professor Honored by Carnegie Foundation,” https://web.archive.org/web/20070926213156/http://news.mywebpal.com/partners/680/public/news763478.html (November 16, 2006)

External links 
 CASE Web site
 CASE Summit for Advancement Leaders
 CASE/Carnegie U.S. Professors of the Year

Non-profit organizations based in Washington, D.C.
Educational organizations based in the United States